Christmas in Vienna III (known in the USA as Vienna Noël) is a 1995 Christmas album released by Spanish operatic tenor Plácido Domingo, French chanson and pop music star Charles Aznavour, and Norwegian crossover soprano Sissel Kyrkjebø on the Sony Classical label.

It was recorded on December 22, 1994, at the Alte Winterreitschule in Vienna, Austria, the third of Plácido Domingo's numerous Christmas in Vienna concerts. The Vienna Symphony, under the direction of maestro Vjekoslav Šutej, provided orchestral accompanying to the three singers, and the Vienna Children's Choir provided choral backups.

The concert proved to be a success; the recorded event was broadcast internationally and released as an album internationally during the 1995 Christmas season. It reached the number one spot on the Norwegian albums chart.

Track listing
 Hark! The Herald Angels Sing
 Noëls D'autrefois
 When a Child is Born
 A Very Private Christmas
 Ave Maria
 Carol of the Bells
 Es ist ein Ros entsprungen/Det Hev Ei Rose Sprunge
 Un Enfant Est Né
 I'll Walk with God
 Un Enfant de Toi pour Noël/My Own Child for Christmas from You
 The Twelve Days of Christmas
 Medley: It's Christmas Time All over the World/Auld Lang Syne/Let It Snow, Let It Snow, Let It Snow/Let There Be Peace on Earth/We Wish You a Merry Christmas
 Kum Ba Yah, My Lord
 Silent Night/Noche de Paz/Stille Nacht

Chart performance

See also
 Christmas in Vienna
 Christmas in Vienna II
 Christmas in Vienna VI

References

1995 Christmas albums
1995 live albums
Live Christmas albums
Plácido Domingo albums
Sissel Kyrkjebø albums
Christmas albums by Spanish artists
Christmas albums by French artists
Christmas albums by Norwegian artists